The Haworth Baronetcy, of Dunham Massey in the County of Chester, is a title in the Baronetage of the United Kingdom. It was created on 3 July 1911 for Arthur Haworth, Liberal Member of Parliament for Manchester South from 1906 to 1912.

Haworth baronets, of Dunham Massey (1911)
Sir Arthur Adlington Haworth, 1st Baronet (1865–1944)
Sir (Arthur) Geoffrey Haworth, 2nd Baronet (1896–1987)
Sir Philip Haworth, 3rd Baronet (1927–2019)
Sir Christopher Haworth, 4th Baronet (born 1951)

The heir apparent is the present holder's son, Oliver Jonathan Christopher Haworth (born 1996)

Notes

References
Kidd, Charles & Williamson, David (eds.). Debrett's Peerage and Baronetage (1990 edition). New York: St Martin's Press, 1990, 

Haworth